Ashland Town Center is an enclosed shopping mall located in the city of Ashland, Kentucky, United States. One of two malls serving the city, it is located on U.S. Highway 23 near downtown Ashland. The mall features more than seventy retailers and restaurants, as well as a food court. The mall's anchor stores are Belk Women and Kid's, TJ Maxx, Ulta Beauty, JCPenney, Kay Jewelers, Belk Men and Home, Jo-Ann Fabrics, and Aspen Dental. The mall is managed by Washington Prime Group.

History
Ashland Town Center was developed in 1988 as a joint venture of Glimcher Realty Trust (the mall's owner), along with Edward J. Debartolo Corporation (now part of Simon Property Group) and Crown American. The mall opened in 1989 with Walmart, JCPenney, and Hess's as its original anchor stores; Goody's was later added as a fourth anchor. Throughout the 1990s, Ashland Town Center went largely unchanged. In 1993, the Hess's chain sold several of its locations to Alcoa, Tennessee-based Proffitt's, which in turn sold its stores to Belk in 2006.

Mid-2000s renovations
In 2005, the Walmart anchor was vacated when Walmart relocated to a new Supercenter outside the mall itself. The former Walmart space was then demolished in early 2008 for a newer JCPenney store. Construction on this new store, one of three JCPenney prototype stores in the U.S., began soon afterward. Opened in August 2008, the store is twice the size of the former location. The existing JCPenney store was vacated, with half of it becoming a Belk Men and Home Store in 2009. This store replaced a Belk Men's Store in the Belk wing, which became a relocated Hibbett Sports in late 2009.

In addition to the relocation of JCPenney, Ashland Town Center went through further renovations in 2008 and 2009. The food court was downsized to make room for new retail space, a family restroom was created and the Men's and Women's restrooms were both remodeled. Additional mall tenants were also relocated to create more space in the JCPenney corridor. A Cheddar's Casual Café was also constructed in the parking lot near JCPenney.

In 2010, TJ Maxx replaced Goody's as an anchor store and Rax, Panera Bread and The Children's Place also opened new stores in the mall.

References

External links
 Ashland Town Center

Ashland, Kentucky
Shopping malls established in 1989
Shopping malls in Kentucky
Washington Prime Group
Buildings and structures in Boyd County, Kentucky
Tourist attractions in Boyd County, Kentucky
1989 establishments in Kentucky
Commercial buildings completed in 1989